Ali Aslan (born 1932) is a former chief of staff of the Syrian Army, a member of the Central Committee of the Syrian Regional Branch of the Arab Socialist Ba'ath Party and a close confidant of the late Syrian president Hafez al-Assad. Aslan was not only considered to be powerful member of the late Hafez Assad's inner circle, but he was also regarded by outside observers as having significantly improved Syrian military readiness while operating under severe financial constraints.

Early life
Aslan hails from an Alawite family which are part of the Kalbiyya tribe as Hafez Assad. He was born in 1932.

Career
Aslan joined the Syrian Army in 1956. He was trained at the Military Academy of Homs, and continued his training in the Soviet Union. He was appointed commander of the Syrian 8th Infantry Brigade in October 1966. His breakthrough came in November 1970 when he supported the military coup that brought Hafez Assad to power in Syria, and he was designated leader of the 1st and 5th Infantry Divisions of the Syrian Army. In 1972, he was appointed chief of the "operations" bureau of the Syrian Army General Staff. He commanded 5th mechanized infantry in 1973. His troops were successful in the opening stages of the 1973 Yom Kippur War, as they broke through the Israeli defensive line and drove Israeli forces out of southern and central Golan Heights.

He became in charge of the Syrian Army contingent involved in Lebanon from 1976 to 1979, supervising the "hundred days war" against the Christian militia of Bachir Gemayel. At the beginning of the 1980s Aslan was deputy chief of staff and head of operations. He was appointed commander of the 2nd Corps (Syria), and promoted to lieutenant general in July 1984. In 1989, he was named assistant chief of staff of the Syrian Army, becoming the true "operational brain" of the Syrian Army. He was promoted to chief of staff on 5 July 1998, replacing Hikmat al-Shihabi who had been office in 1973 after his forced retirement. Aslan was a proponent of mandatory conscription for Syrian men, and was the main negotiator for arms deals with suppliers around the world, including Russia, China, Armenia, North Korea and Iran, as well as military treaties with Japan and several Eastern European countries.

After the death of Hafez Assad in 2000, a 9-member committee was formed to oversee the transition period, and Aslan was among its members. In addition, he became a member of the Baath Party's central committee in the Summer of 2000. Aslan was one of the senior officials, who contributed to secure the rule of Bashar Assad. However, he was relieved from his post as chief of staff by Bashar Assad in January 2002, as part of the younger president's program of reform and after reported clashes with Assef Shawqat regarding personnel changes. Aslan was replaced by his then deputy, Hassan Turkmani. Aslan was later appointed military advisor to the president. In June 2005, Aslan was removed from the central committee of the Baath Party, and he retired from politics.

His nephew Qusay was married to Bashar al-Assad's cousin, Falak Jamil, but they divorced.

Honours

National honours
:
 Order of Civil Merit (Excellent class) (2021)

References

1932 births
Living people
Homs Military Academy alumni
Arab Socialist Ba'ath Party – Syria Region politicians
People from Latakia
Chiefs of Staff of the Syrian Army
Syrian Alawites